Megachile roeweri is a species of bee in the family Megachilidae. It was described by Alfken in 1927.

References

Roeweri
Insects described in 1927